She's the Man is a 2006 American romantic comedy teen sports film directed by Andy Fickman and starring Amanda Bynes, Channing Tatum, Laura Ramsey, Vinnie Jones, and David Cross. Inspired by William Shakespeare's play Twelfth Night, the film centers on teenager Viola Hastings, who enters her brother's new boarding school, Illyria Prep, in his place and pretends to be a boy in order to play on the boys' soccer team.

The film was a moderate commercial success, grossing $57.2 million against a budget of $20–25 million. The film received mixed reviews from critics, but Bynes' performance was praised.

Plot

Viola Hastings is a teen girl who plays for the girls soccer team at her high school, Cornwall Prep. Her dream is to play for the North Carolina Tar Heels. However, the team gets cut. Viola and her friends try to join the boys team, but the coach refuses. Viola’s boyfriend, Justin, supports the coaches decision, upsetting Viola, resulting in them breaking up. 
Meanwhile, her twin brother, Sebastian has to enroll in Illyria, an elite boarding school, as he was recently expelled from Cornwall for skipping classes, but he secretly goes to London with his fledgling band instead. Sebastian is also struggling with his relationship with his shallow girlfriend, Monique.

Viola agrees to cover for Sebastian by telling each of their divorced parents that he is staying at the other’s house. Viola decides to pass herself off as Sebastian, hoping to join their boys' team and beat Cornwall to prove their coach and her cocky ex-boyfriend, Justin, wrong for suggesting cancellation of the ladies' soccer team. With the help of her stylist friend, Paul, she is transformed into "Sebastian" and attends Illyria in his place.

While moving in, she meets her roommate, Duke Orsino, Illyria's attractive soccer team captain. During tryouts, Viola fails to impress Coach Dinklage and is assigned to second string, much to her dismay. Her teammates, including Duke, initially dislike "Sebastian" as he's awkward and strange. However, with help from Paul once again, they begin to accept him into their social circle. 

"Sebastian" then gets the popular and beautiful Olivia Lennox as his lab partner, which frustrates Duke, as he has feelings for her. "Sebastian" agrees to put in a good word for him if he trains him to be a better soccer player. Coach Dinklage eventually notices "Sebastian's" effort and improvement, promoting him to first string.

At the Junior League carnival, where her mother has made her volunteer, Viola works a shift at the kissing booth and kisses Duke. Duke expresses to "Sebastian" that he might move on from Olivia as he is starting to like Viola now. She is delighted as she secretly feels the same way.

Olivia, who now has a crush on "Sebastian", asks Duke out on a date, hoping to make "Sebastian" jealous. Viola, who is unaware of Olivia's true intentions, is enraged instead because Duke has now abandoned his interest in Viola. When she finds out the truth, she encourages Olivia to tell "Sebastian" directly how she feels.

The situation becomes complicated when the real Sebastian returns from London a day early, unbeknownst to Viola. As soon as he arrives at Illyria, Olivia confesses her feelings and kisses him. Duke, seeing this, believes his roommate has betrayed him. When "Sebastian" returns to their room, they have an argument and Duke kicks him out. Viola oversleeps and misses the first half of the game, while the real Sebastian is mistaken for "Sebastian" and winds up poorly playing his sister's game instead. At half-time, Viola explains the situation to him and they switch places again.

Duke, still furious at "Sebastian", refuses to cooperate with him on the field. Determined to makes amends, "Sebastian" shows everyone he is actually Viola. Illyria wins the game when Viola scores a goal, finally humiliating Justin and the rest of the Cornwall boys.

Everyone at Illyria celebrates their victory over Cornwall, except for Duke who is hurt about Viola's deception. Viola introduces Sebastian and Olivia officially, and they begin dating. She and Sebastian's divorced parents also make up, exchanging contact information to be better parents for their children. She invites Duke to her debutante ball, through an invitation delivered by Sebastian, now Duke's actual roommate. Still hurt, Duke doesn't respond to the invitation, devastating her. 

At the ball, Viola fears Duke won't show up; she distracts herself by assisting Olivia, who is being escorted by Sebastian to the ball, and is touched that Paul offers to be her date. Her mother shows up with a dress suiting Viola's "no ruffles" policy, but Viola decides to go for a walk instead. 

Viola finds Duke outside, who admits he has feelings for her, but insists on no more deception, which she promises. At the ball, Monique is escorted by Justin, Olivia by Sebastian, and Viola and Duke enter the stage late, but together, with Viola in her new dress, much to the joy of her mother. Viola and Duke share a kiss before joining the crowd. At the end of the film, Viola and Duke are shown happily playing on Illyria's soccer team together.

Cast
 Amanda Bynes as Viola Hastings, a talented soccer player underestimated for being a girl, who dresses up as her twin brother Sebastian to play soccer at Illyria
 Channing Tatum as Duke Orsino, the soccer team captain, who is in love with Olivia and, later, with Viola
 Laura Ramsey as Olivia Lennox, a smart girl who falls in love with Sebastian (Viola)
 James Snyder as Malcolm Festes, the school nerd and Sebastian's (Viola's) rival
 Emily Perkins as Eunice Bates, the nerdy and eccentric classmate with weird sexual fantasies
 Alex Breckenridge as Monique Valentine, Sebastian's superficial girlfriend
 James Kirk as Sebastian Hastings, Viola's twin brother, who is in Europe with his band.
 Robert Hoffman as Justin Drayton, Viola's ex-boyfriend and Duke's rival
 Vinnie Jones as Coach Dinklage
 David Cross as Principal Horatio Gold
 Julie Hagerty as Daphne Hastings, the mother of Viola and Sebastian
 John Pyper-Ferguson as Roger Hastings, the father of Viola and Sebastian
 Brandon Jay McLaren as Toby, one of Duke's best friends, who is attracted to Eunice
 Clifton Murray as Andrew, one of Duke's best friends
 Jonathan Sadowski as Paul Antonio, Viola's best friend and hair stylist
 Amanda Crew as Kia, one of Viola's friends
 Jessica Lucas as Yvonne, one of Viola's friends
 Lynda Boyd as Cheryl, the debutante ball's hostess
 Katie Stuart as Maria, Olivia's friend
 Robert Torti as Coach Pistonek
 Mark Acheson as Groundskeeper

Production 

An adaptation of William Shakespeare's Twelfth Night, the film was directed by Andy Fickman, produced by Lauren Shuler Donner, Tom Rosenberg, and Gary Lucchesi, and was written by Karen McCullah Lutz and Kirsten Smith.

Amanda Bynes and Channing Tatum were cast respectively in the lead roles of Viola Hastings and Duke Orsino; Tatum had been chosen at Bynes' insistence, as she felt that he would be received well by audiences. She told Paper in 2018 that "I totally fought for Channing [to get cast in] that movie because he wasn't famous yet," she said. "He'd just done a Mountain Dew commercial and I was like, 'This guy's a star—every girl will love him!' But [the producers] were like, 'He's so much older than all of you!' And I was like, 'It doesn't matter! Trust me!'"

In order to prepare for the role, as it was her first time playing a role of the opposite sex, Bynes and Fickman observed males at a shopping mall. In an interview with MSN in 2006, she said that the part had been difficult for her to play, stating that she felt "awkward" in the role; she later spoke highly of the experience, saying that "It was hard, but I did it and I did something that was not easy for me—so it was a cathartic experience and I felt really good getting it out of me." However, in a 2018 interview with Paper, Bynes admitted that her role in the film eventually had a negative effect on her mental health. "When the movie came out and I saw it, I went into a deep depression for four to six months because I didn't like how I looked when I was a boy," Bynes said. Seeing herself onscreen with short hair, thick eyebrows, and sideburns was "a strange and out of body experience."

Neither Bynes nor Tatum were skilled at soccer before filming, so they played the sport for hours each day to prepare for the role. In a bathroom scene in the film, where a fight occurs between the characters of Bynes and actresses Laura Ramsey and Alexandra Breckenridge, some of the stunts performed had been done by the actors themselves. Fickman stated in a behind-the-scenes feature that "As much as we had our three wonderful stunt actresses there, too, when you see the cut of the movie, it's a lot of our girls pounding each other,".

Release

Home media
The film debuted on DVD on July 18, 2006 in both widescreen and fullscreen editions. For the film's 15th anniversary, Paramount released the film on Blu-ray for the first time on March 2, 2021.

Reception

Box office
The film opened at #4 at the North American box office making $10.7 million USD in its opening weekend. Its budget was approximately $20–25 million, and the film grossed $33,687,630 million domestically with a total gross of $57.2 million worldwide.

Critical response

Review aggregation website Rotten Tomatoes gave She's the Man a rating of 43% based on 113 reviews, with an average rating of 5.10/10. The critical consensus reads, "Shakespeare's wit gets lost in translation with She's the Man'''s broad slapstick, predictable jokes, and unconvincing plotline." Metacritic, gave the film has a weighted average score of 45 out of 100 based on reviews from 28 critics, indicating "mixed or average reviews". Audiences surveyed by CinemaScore gave the film a grade "B+" on scale of A to F.

Roger Ebert of the Chicago Sun-Times wrote "...Amanda Bynes let us say that she is sunny and plucky and somehow finds a way to play her impossible role without clearing her throat more than six or eight times. More importantly, we like her." Writing for the San Francisco Chronicle, critic Ruth Stein wrote: "Bynes displays a flair for comedy, especially when Viola studies guys walking down the street and mimics their gait and mannerisms. Bynes uses her elastic face to show Viola's every thought making the transition and doing her darnedest to pull it off... She's not going to win an Oscar for playing a boy, as Hilary Swank did [in Boys Don't Cry]; but Bynes makes a far more convincing one than Barbra Streisand in Yentl."

Refinery29 wrote in a review praising Bynes' both as Viola and Sebastian, writing "As Viola, Bynes is confident and charming, the kind of Jennifer Lawrence-like cool girl who would gladly hand you a tampon in the bathroom—as long as she’s not already using it to stop a nosebleed. As Sebastian, she oozes an inexplicable form of awkward charisma, spitting out perfect line delivery after perfect line delivery, her facial expressions working overtime to nail the laugh. It remains one of her best, most challenging performances."

Criticism was brought towards Tatum's casting. Roger Ebert wrote: "Tatum is 26, a little old to play a high school kid..." Neil Smith for BBCi stated that "Bynes tackles her part with gusto, while Tatum underplays his to striking effect."

 Accolades 

See also
 Just One of the Guys, a 1985 teen comedy with a similar premise
 Hana-Kimi'', a 1996 - 2004 shōjo manga literature series

References

External links

 
 
 
 
 

2006 films
2006 romantic comedy films
2000s feminist films
2000s high school films
2000s sports comedy films
2000s teen comedy films
2000s teen romance films
2006 in women's association football
American association football films
American feminist comedy films
American high school films
American romantic comedy films
American sports comedy films
American teen comedy films
American teen romance films
Cross-dressing in American films
DreamWorks Pictures films
2000s English-language films
Women's association football films
Masculinity
Films based on Twelfth Night
Films directed by Andy Fickman
Films produced by Roger Birnbaum
Films produced by Lauren Shuler Donner
Films scored by Nathan Wang
Films set in the United States
Films shot in Vancouver
Lakeshore Entertainment films
Modern adaptations of works by William Shakespeare
Paramount Pictures films
Teen films based on works by William Shakespeare
Teen sports films
Films set in boarding schools
2000s American films